McKinnell is a surname. Notable people with the surname include:

Catherine McKinnell (born 1976), British Labour Party politician
Henry McKinnell (born 1943), former CEO and chairman of Pfizer Inc
Jimmy McKinnell (footballer) (1893–1972), Scottish footballer
Jimmy McKinnell Sr. (died 1965), manager of Scottish football club Queen of the South
Jimmy McKinnell Jr. (died 1995), secretary and manager of Queen of the South
Nan Bangs McKinnell (1913–2012), American ceramicist and educator
William McKinnell (1873–1939), politician in Manitoba, Canada